Marmorata (from the Latin marmor for "marble") can refer to several different species or conditions presenting with a marbled appearance, including:

 Salmo marmoratus, marble trout
 Acronicta marmorata, marble dagger moth
 Synodontis marmorata, a catfish
 Pleurodema marmorata, a frog
 Cutis marmorata telangiectatica congenita, a disease